Montgomery County High School, is a public high school located in Mount Sterling, Kentucky, United States, serving grades 9-12.  The school is the only high school within Montgomery County, Kentucky. Enrollment in the 2021–2022 school year was 1,388 students.  The student-to-teacher ratio is 17.9. 57% of the students qualify for free or reduced lunch.

Mock Trial
Montgomery County High School has a nationally recognized mock trial program.  The school won the 2022 National High School Mock Trial Championship. Since 2001 the team has placed in the top ten in the nation five times and finished in the top-20 ten times. The team has also won fourteen Kentucky state titles.

References

External links
Montgomery County High School website
Montgomery County Public Schools website

Public high schools in Kentucky
Schools in Montgomery County, Kentucky
Mount Sterling, Kentucky